Eugene Myroshnichenko (also spelled as Yevhen Miroshnichenko, Russian: Евгений Гордеевич Мирошниченко) is a Russian/Ukrainian literature critic, historian, and journalist.  In 1980, Myroshnichenko received his PhD in Russian literature from Moscow State University.  His dissertation was on the role of the Literature Critic magazine in literature criticism of the 1930s.

1977 - 2005 Myroshnichenko was a professor at Nikolaev State University (Nikolaev, Ukraine).  Since 2005 he has been teaching at the Nikolaev branch of Ukraine University.

Myroshnichenko is a corresponding member of the International Cyril-Methodius Academy of Slavic Enlightenment.  He is also a member of the Writers' Union of Russia and was awarded an International Prince Yuri Dolgoruki Literature Prize.

Bibliography

Books 
 2008 - Literaturniy Nikolaev (putevoditel') (A Literature Guide to Nikolaev)
 2007 - Gorod i mif (The City and a Myth)
 2005 - Chayka nad Limanom (A Seagull over the Liman)
 2003 - Vremya i bremya kul'tury (Time and Burden of Culture)
 2001 - Ya zachem-to s'ezdil v Nikolaev (I happened to go to Nikolaev)

20th-century Ukrainian historians
Russian literary critics
Living people
1939 births
21st-century Ukrainian historians